Tytus Czyżewski (28 December 1880 in Przyszowa – 5 May 1945 in Kraków) was a Polish painter, art theoretician, Futurist poet, playwright, member of the Polish Formists and a Colorist.

Biography
In 1902 he studied at the Academy of Fine Arts in Krakow in the painting studios of Józef Mehoffer and Leon Wyczółkowski. Czyżewski travelled to Paris and learned from the artistic trends there. He began exhibiting in 1906. Czyżewski painting style was highly influenced by Cézanne and El Greco, whose work he admired until his death.

In 1917, with the brothers Zbigniew and Andrzej Pronaszko, he organized in Kraków an exhibition of Polish Expressionist works. The group later became known as the Polish Formists. Until the break-up of the Formists in 1922, he was the primary artist and theoretician behind the movement as well as the joint editor of the periodical Formiści. He was also co-founder of the Polish Futurist clubs, and published Futurist-inspired "visual poetry." Czyżewski brief flirted with Surrealism and spent the rest of his life as a Colorist.

Selected work
Poetry:
Zielone Oko. Poezje formistyczne. Elektryczne wizje, 1920
Noc – dzień. Mechaniczny instynkt elektryczny, 1922
Pastorałki, 1925
Robespierre. Rapsod. Cinema. Od romantyzmu do cynizmu, 1927
Lajkonik w chmurach, 1936
Prose:
A Burglar of the Better Sort: Plays, Verse, Theoretical Notes. Translated by Charles Kraszewski. Publisher: Glagoslav Publication, 2019.

References
Czyżewski Biography
 Profile of Tytus Czyżewski  at Culture.pl
 Artola, Inés R. (2015), Formiści: la síntesis de la modernidad (1917 – 1922). Conexiones y protagonistas, Granada: Libargo,

External links

ArtNet: More works by Czyżewski.

Polish male dramatists and playwrights
Futurologists
20th-century Polish painters
20th-century Polish male artists
1880 births
1945 deaths
20th-century Polish poets
20th-century Polish dramatists and playwrights
Polish male poets
20th-century Polish male writers
People from Limanowa County
Polish male painters